Stephanie Cristina Cayo Sanguinetti (born April 8, 1988) is a Peruvian actress, singer and songwriter.

Early life
When she was 10 years old, she appeared in Peruvian telenovela Travesuras del Corazón. She later appeared as a primary character in several TV series, particularly gaining international exposure playing the main female character in the internationally-broadcast Besos Robados.

Filmography

See also 
 List of Peruvians

References

External links
 

Living people
1988 births
Actresses from Lima
21st-century Peruvian women singers
21st-century Peruvian singers
Peruvian female models
Peruvian musical theatre actresses
Peruvian telenovela actresses
Singers from Lima
20th-century Peruvian actresses
21st-century Peruvian actresses
Peruvian people of Italian descent